The 1939–40 Divizia B was the sixth season of the second tier of the Romanian football league system.

The format has been maintained, four series of 10 teams. The winners of the series were supposed to promote in the Divizia A, but the winners of the 3rd and 4th series were not promoted from different reasons. Also 3rd and 4th place from the first series and the sixth place from the second series were promoted to fill the vacant places from Divizia A.

Team changes

To Divizia B
Promoted from Divizia C
 Astra-Metrom Brașov
 CFR Turnu Severin
 Cimentul Turda
 Electrica Timișoara
 Feroemail Ploiești
 Maccabi Chișinău
 Mica Brad
 Muncitorul Cernăuți
 Oltul Sfântu Gheorghe
 Sparta Mediaș
 SS Doc Galați
 SSM Reșița

Relegated from Divizia A
 Chinezul Timișoara
 Tricolor Ploiești
 Gloria Arad

From Divizia B
Relegated to Divizia C
 CFR Brașov
 Luceafărul București
 Hatmanul Luca Arbore Radăuți
 Unirea MV Alba Iulia
 SG Sibiu
 Mociornița Colțea București
 Jahn Cernăuți
 Șoimii Sibiu
 Tricolor Baia Mare

Promoted to Divizia A
 CAM Timișoara
 Unirea Tricolor București
 Gloria CFR Galați

Renamed teams
Dacia Unirea Brăila was renamed as FC Brăila.

Monopol Târgu Mureș was renamed as CS Târgu Mureș.

Sporting Chișinău was renamed as Nistru Chișinău.

Disqualified teams
Mihai Viteazul Chișinău and Textila Moldova Iași were disqualified.

Other teams
Craiovan Craiova and Rovine Grivița Craiova merged, the new formed team was named FC Craiova.

League tables

Serie I

Serie II

Serie III

Serie IV

See also 
 1939–40 Divizia A

References

Liga II seasons
Romania
2